Diarmaid Ó Donnchadha, Bishop of Kilmacduagh, fl. 1418.

Appointed and consecrated c. July 1418,  Ó Donnchadha had died before October 1419. A Dionysius Ó Donnchadha became bishop from 1441 to 1478.

References
 http://www.ucc.ie/celt/published/T100005C/
 http://www.irishtimes.com/ancestor/surname/index.cfm?fuseaction=Go.&UserID= 
 The Surnames of Ireland, Edward MacLysaght, 1978.
 A New History of Ireland: Volume IX - Maps, Genealogies, Lists, ed. T.W. Moody, F.X. Martin, F.J. Byrne, pp. 322–324.

People from County Galway
15th-century Roman Catholic bishops in Ireland